Jorunna labialis is a species of sea slug, a dorid nudibranch, a shell-less marine gastropod mollusc in the family Discodorididae.

Distribution
This species was described from the Red Sea. It has been reported from Tanzania and Madagascar in the Indian Ocean.

References

Discodorididae
Gastropods described in 1908